Edward Washburn Kellogg (February 20, 1883 – May 29, 1960) was an American inventor who invented the moving coil loudspeaker in 1925 along with Chester W. Rice at General Electric

Biography
He was born in Washington in 1883. He was a graduate of Phillips Academy, in Andover (Class of 1902)

He was the joint inventor of the moving coil loudspeaker in 1925 along with Chester W. Rice at General Electric, and independently by Edward Wente at Bell Labs. Kellogg also patented an electrostatic loudspeaker in 1934.

Kellogg was the first director of the GE Advanced Technology Laboratory in Schenectady, New York, which later became a part of RCA Victor in Camden, New Jersey (and is now part of Lockheed Martin).

He died in 1960.

References

External links

Rice-Kellogg loudspeaker design
 "Production of Sound" (improved electrostatic design), filed September 1929, issued December 1934
Edward W. Kellogg (1955), "History of Sound Motion Pictures", Journal of the SMPTE

American acoustical engineers
1883 births
1960 deaths
20th-century American inventors
People from Washington (state)